Sir is a 1993 Indian Hindi-language romantic drama film directed by Mahesh Bhatt starring debutant Atul Agnihotri and Pooja Bhatt in the lead roles, with Naseeruddin Shah playing the title role. Paresh Rawal and Gulshan Grover play the main villains. The film was remade in Telugu as Gangmaster, with Rajasekhar.

Plot
Mumbai-based college lecturer Amar Verma (Naseeruddin Shah) lives with his wife, Shobha (Soni Razdan), and 6-year-old son, Kunal. When a war breaks out between gang lords Veljibhai (Paresh Rawal) and Chhapan Tikli (Gulshan Grover) alias Jimmy, a number of innocent bystanders fall victim, one of whom is Kunal. This devastates the Verma family. Shobha walks out on Amar, who then devotes his life to his students. Many years later, when he finds out that a student, Pooja (Pooja Bhatt), has a problem of stammering, he decides to help her. He finds out that she is the only child of gangster Veljibhai. Amar meets with Veljibhai, discusses the gang-war scenario, then meets with Chhapan Tikli and does the same. Amar gets the gangsters to agree on a truce so that he can take Pooja and the rest of the students on a field trip to Bangalore. Amar will soon find out that neither Veljibhai nor Chhapan Tikli has any intention of keeping any truce. As the two dons engage in a fight to the finish, it seems that Amar may well have jeopardized his own life as well as the lives of Pooja and the other students. An additional complication arises with Pooja falling in love with her classmate Karan (Atul Agnihotri) and wishing to marry him against the wishes of her father.

Cast
Naseeruddin Shah as Professor Amar Verma
Atul Agnihotri as Karan Luchad
Pooja Bhatt as Pooja Patekar, Veljibhai's daughter.
Paresh Rawal as Veljibhai Patekar
Avtar Gill as Arjun Daas
Soni Razdan as Shobha Verma, Arun's wife.
Sushmita Mukherjee as Sweety Tikli, Jimmy's sister.
Gulshan Grover as Chhappan Tikli / a.k.a. Jimmy
Abha Ranjan as Mrs. Patekar, Velji's wife.
Mushtaq Khan as Kaluba
Mahesh Anand as Rajan, Jimmy's henchman.
Makrand Deshpande as Mack
Anang Desai as Doctor
Master Kunal Kemmu as Kunal Verma, Arun & Shobha's son.
Brownie Parasher as the Last man killed by Kaluba.
Suhas Bhalekar
Anant Jog
Viplove Rai
Vikas Anand
G. P. Singh
Gopal Poojari
Kamal Malik
Deepak Sinha
Anjana
Banjara

Awards 
39th Filmfare Awards:

Won

 Best Villain – Paresh Rawal
 Best Dialogue – Prof. Jay Dixit

 Nominated

 Best Supporting Actor – Naseeruddin Shah
 Best Villain – Gulshan Grover

Track listing
The soundtrack album of the movie composed by Anu Malik .. and Penned by Qateel Shifai..

External links
 

1990s Hindi-language films
1993 films
Films featuring a Best Supporting Actor National Film Award-winning performance
Hindi films remade in other languages
Films directed by Mahesh Bhatt
Films scored by Anu Malik